Ashley Matthews (born 26 November 1969) is a former Australian rules footballer who played for the Carlton Football Club and Fitzroy Football Club in the Victorian Football League (VFL). He was recruited from Lilydale in the Eastern Districts Football League (EDFL).

When he finished his VFL career Ashley returned to grass roots football including to Lilydale as its captain and coach. He coached Lilydale to a premiership in 1996 in the EDFL  and again in 1998 this time in the Eastern Football League (EFL) both in the second division of the competition.

Although he coached Lilydale in first division in 1997 they were not competitive and were immediately relegated.

He also has been "Chairman of Selectors" at the club when working with coach Brett Fisher in 2006 and 2007 in the first division of the EFL.

Matthews is also member of the club's "Team of the Century" as coach.

In 2016, Matthews coached the East Ringwood U13A team to the EFL U13 premiership.

References

External links

1969 births
Living people
Australian rules footballers from Victoria (Australia)
Carlton Football Club players
Fitzroy Football Club players